Varvara Lepchenko was the defending champion, but lost to Monica Puig in the second round.

Sesil Karatantcheva won the title defeating Michelle Larcher de Brito in the final 6–1, 7–5.

Seeds

Draw

Finals

Top half

Bottom half

References
 Main Draw
 Qualifying Draw

Goldwater Women's Tennis Classic - Singles